OKBM Afrikantov (full name: OAO I. I. Afrikantov OKB Mechanical Engineering) is a nuclear engineering company located in Nizhny Novgorod, Russia. It is a subsidiary of Rosatom. The company is named after Igor Afrikantov.

The company is best known as the main designer for the Soviet Union's and Russia's flagship nuclear propulsion projects, including reactors for nuclear submarines, nuclear-powered icebreakers, and the floating nuclear power plant project. It also designs fast breeder reactors.

History
The company was founded in 1945. In 1998, it was named after its former chief designer and director I. I. Afrikantov.

Products
The company is a developer of the nuclear reactors. It has designed and assembled KLT-40S reactors for the first Russian floating nuclear power station Akademik Lomonosov.   It also developed the RITM-200 design pressurized water reactor which is used for LK-60 model nuclear-powered icebreaker.

OKBM Afrikantov participated in the construction of China Experimental Fast Reactor.

Naval reactors 
The company has been the primary designer of naval reactors for both military and civilian uses:
KN-3 reactor, OK-150 reactor, OK-550 reactor, OK-650 reactor, KLT-40 reactor, RITM-200, RITM-400, ABV Reactor, VBER-300 and more.

Military-related reactors 
Several reactors located on three secret cities were designed by the company to produce plutonium for nuclear weapons:
AV Reactor, OK-180 reactor, OK-190 reactor, OK-190M reactor, LF-2 “Ludmila” Reactor, AD Reactor, ADE-1 Reactor, ADE-2 Reactor, ADE-3 Reactor, ADE-4 Reactor, ADE-5 Reactor.

Reactors 
A list of some reactors under her flagship or participation:

References

External links

 

Nuclear technology companies of Russia
Nuclear technology in the Soviet Union
Companies of the Soviet Union
Rosatom
Construction and civil engineering companies established in 1945
Technology companies established in 1945
1945 establishments in Russia
1945 establishments in the Soviet Union
Manufacturing companies based in Nizhniy Novgorod
Design bureaus